Piney Fork is an unincorporated community in central Smithfield Township, Jefferson County, Ohio, United States.  The stream of Piney Fork flows southeast past the community; it meets Short Creek in far western Warren Township, and Short Creek in turn meets the Ohio River at Rayland.

Piney Fork is part of the Weirton–Steubenville, WV-OH Metropolitan Statistical Area.

A Presbyterian church was built at Piney Fork in 1800. A post office called Piney Fork operated from 1902 to 2012.

Piney Fork used to be a thriving small town with a dentist, a doctor, a school, a few churches, and some bars until the coal mine shut down. Most people have moved on from Piney Fork because the businesses have left.

Education
Public education in the community of Piney Fork is provided by the Buckeye Local School District.

References

Unincorporated communities in Jefferson County, Ohio
Unincorporated communities in Ohio